Blawith and Subberthwaite is a civil parish in the South Lakeland District of Cumbria, England. It contains nine listed buildings that are recorded in the National Heritage List for England.  All the listed buildings are designated at Grade II, the lowest of the three grades, which is applied to "buildings of national importance and special interest".  The parish contains the village of Blawith and surrounding countryside and hills.  The listed buildings consist of a ruined church, houses and associated structures, farmhouses and farm buildings, and a bridge. 


Buildings

References

Citations

Sources

Lists of listed buildings in Cumbria